The European Junior Swimming Championships  (50 m) is an annual swimming competition for European swimmers organized by the Ligue Européenne de Natation and held over five days. The competitor age for females was 15 to 16 years; for males it is 17 to 18 years until 2015. From 2016 the competitor age is for females 14 to 17 years and for males 15 to 18 years.

History
Until 1989 the European Junior Diving Championships was held together with European Junior Swimming Championships, and even since then has sometimes been co-hosted with the European Junior Swimming Championships, for example in Palma de Mallorca in 2006.

A stand-alone European Junior Swimming Championships was not held in 2015; instead the junior swimming events formed the bulk aquatics program at the 2015 European Games. European Games champions and medalists for that year were simultaneously treated as champions and medalists of the European Junior Swimming Championships for the purposes of 2015.

Championships

 As the aquatics program of the 2015 European Games.

Championships records
All records were set in finals unless noted otherwise. All times are swum in a long-course (50m) pool.

Men

Women

Mixed

References

 
International swimming competitions
LEN European Aquatics Championships
S
Swimming competitions in Europe
LEN competitions
Youth swimming